Cup of Tea is an album by Irish traditional Celtic band Sláinte, which renamed itself Mooncoyne in 2007.  Released in 2000, Cup of Tea is a mixture of tunes and songs from Mooncoyne's repertoire.

Track listing
"The Banshee - Gravel Walks - The Old Copperplate" (Traditional) – 3:50
"Mairi's Wedding" (Traditional) – 2:13
"The Butterfly - Kid on the Mountain" (Traditional) – 4:07
"Fear A Bhata" (Traditional) – 5:10
"Britches Full of Stitches - Munster Bank - Bill Sullivan's (The A Polkas)" (Traditional) – 4:13
"The Manx Lullaby" (Traditional) – 3:32
"Scully's Reel - Mrs McLeod's - Cooley's Reel" (Traditional) – 3:37
"Lakes Of Pontchartrain" (Traditional) – 5:45
"Lark in the Morning - The Atholl Highlanders" (Traditional) – 4:10
"She Moved Through The Fair" (Traditional) – 5:30
"The Crosses of Annagh - The Humors of Tulla - The Cup of Tea" (Traditional) – 3:47
"Denis Murphy's Polka - I'll Tell Me Ma - John Ryan's Polka" (Traditional) – 3:43
"Fanny Power" (Traditional) – 5:29
"Jig of Slurs - Dublin Reel - Merry Blacksmith - The Mountain Road" (Traditional) – 5:13

Personnel 
Jeff Bremer (concertina/bass)
Lawson Dumbeck (guitar)
Kent Hooper (whistles)
Jean Huskamp (mandolin)
Anthea Lawrence (lead vocals/fiddle)
Bob McCaffery-Lent (guitars/cittern/vocals)
Brynn Starr (fiddle/vocals)

References

External links 
This album was published under Creative Commons at open source audio

Mooncoyne albums
2000 albums